In geometry, demihypercubes (also called n-demicubes, n-hemicubes, and half measure polytopes) are a class of n-polytopes constructed from alternation of an n-hypercube, labeled as hγn for being half of the hypercube family, γn. Half of the vertices are deleted and new facets are formed. The 2n facets become 2n (n−1)-demicubes, and 2n (n−1)-simplex facets are formed in place of the deleted vertices.

They have been named with a demi- prefix to each hypercube name: demicube, demitesseract, etc. The demicube is identical to the regular tetrahedron, and the demitesseract is identical to the regular 16-cell. The demipenteract is considered semiregular for having only regular facets. Higher forms don't have all regular facets but are all uniform polytopes.

The vertices and edges of a demihypercube form two copies of the halved cube graph.

An n-demicube has inversion symmetry if n is even.

Discovery 

Thorold Gosset described the demipenteract in his 1900 publication listing all of the regular and semiregular figures in n-dimensions above 3. He called it a 5-ic semi-regular. It also exists within the semiregular k21 polytope family.

The demihypercubes can be represented by extended Schläfli symbols of the form h{4,3,...,3} as half the vertices of {4,3,...,3}. The vertex figures of demihypercubes are rectified n-simplexes.

Constructions 

They are represented by Coxeter-Dynkin diagrams of three constructive forms: 
...  (As an alternated orthotope) s{21,1,...,1}
... (As an alternated hypercube) h{4,3n−1}
.... (As a demihypercube) {31,n−3,1}

H.S.M. Coxeter also labeled the third bifurcating diagrams as 1k1 representing the lengths of the 3 branches and led by the ringed branch.

An n-demicube, n greater than 2, has n(n−1)/2 edges meeting at each vertex. The graphs below show less edges at each vertex due to overlapping edges in the symmetry projection.

In general, a demicube's elements can be determined from the original n-cube: (with Cn,m = mth-face count in n-cube = 2n−m n!/(m!(n−m)!))
 Vertices: Dn,0 = 1/2 Cn,0 = 2n−1 (Half the n-cube vertices remain)
 Edges: Dn,1 = Cn,2 = 1/2 n(n−1) 2n−2 (All original edges lost, each square faces create a new edge)
 Faces: Dn,2 = 4 * Cn,3 = 2/3 n(n−1)(n−2) 2n−3 (All original faces lost, each cube creates 4 new triangular faces)
 Cells: Dn,3 = Cn,3 + 23 Cn,4 (tetrahedra from original cells plus new ones)
 Hypercells: Dn,4 = Cn,4 + 24 Cn,5 (16-cells and 5-cells respectively)
 ...
 [For m = 3,...,n−1]: Dn,m = Cn,m + 2m Cn,m+1 (m-demicubes and m-simplexes respectively)
...
 Facets: Dn,n−1 = 2n + 2n−1 ((n−1)-demicubes and (n−1)-simplices respectively)

Symmetry group 
The stabilizer of the demihypercube in the hyperoctahedral group (the Coxeter group  [4,3n−1]) has index 2. It is the Coxeter group  [3n−3,1,1] of order , and is generated by permutations of the coordinate axes and reflections along pairs of coordinate axes.

Orthotopic constructions 

Constructions as alternated orthotopes have the same topology, but can be stretched with different lengths in n-axes of symmetry.

The rhombic disphenoid is the three-dimensional example as alternated cuboid. It has three sets of edge lengths, and scalene triangle faces.

See also 
 Hypercube honeycomb
 Semiregular E-polytope

References 

 T. Gosset: On the Regular and Semi-Regular Figures in Space of n Dimensions, Messenger of Mathematics, Macmillan, 1900
 John H. Conway, Heidi Burgiel, Chaim Goodman-Strass, The Symmetries of Things 2008,  (Chapter 26. pp. 409: Hemicubes: 1n1)
 Kaleidoscopes: Selected Writings of H.S.M. Coxeter, editied by F. Arthur Sherk, Peter McMullen, Anthony C. Thompson, Asia Ivic Weiss, Wiley-Interscience Publication, 1995,  
 (Paper 24) H.S.M. Coxeter, Regular and Semi-Regular Polytopes III, [Math. Zeit. 200 (1988) 3-45]

External links 

Multi-dimensional geometry
Polytopes